"We Are Brave" is the lead single on Shawn McDonald's fifth studio album Brave. It was released on February 18, 2014 by Sparrow Records. It was written by McDonald, David Garcia and Christopher Stevens, which it was produced by Garcia and Stevens.

Weekly charts

References 
 

2014 singles
2014 songs
Contemporary Christian songs
Sparrow Records singles